Edward, Eddie, or Ed Jones may refer to:

Architecture
 Edward Vason Jones (1909–1980), American neoclassical architect
 Edward Jones (English architect) (born 1939), English architect who designed the Saïd Business School
 Edward Jones (Welsh architect) (1796–1835), Welsh-born architect and surveyor
 Edward C. Jones (1822–1902), American architect

Arts and entertainment
 Edward Jones (harpist) (1752–1824), Welsh harpist and author
 Edward Elwyn Jones (born 1977), Welsh conductor and organist
 Guitar Slim (Eddie Jones, 1926–1959), American guitarist
 Eddie Jones (jazz musician) (1929–1997), American double bassist
 Eddie "California" Jones, singer with the 1950s American band Emersons
 Eddie Jones (actor) (1934–2019), American actor
 Edward L. Buster Jones (1943–2014), American voice actor
 Eddie Jones (artist) (1935–1999), British SF artist and illustrator
 Edward P. Jones (born 1950), American novelist
 Edward Huws Jones, violinist, composer and arranger

Business
 Edward Jones (statistician) (1856–1920), co-founder of Dow Jones & Company
 Edward Jones Investments, an investment company (founded 1922, formerly known as Edward D. Jones & Co., L.P.)
 Edward D. Jones (1893–1982), investment banker, founder of Edward Jones Investments
 Edward D. "Ted" Jones (1925–1990), his son, businessman and philanthropist
 Edward Lloyd Jones (1874–1934), Australian shorthorn cattle breeder

Politics
 Edward Jones (English politician) (died 1609), English politician
 Edward Jones (North Carolina politician) (1950–2012), American state legislator
 Ed Jones (Tennessee politician) (1912–1999), American US Representative from the state of Tennessee
 Edward F. Jones (1828–1913), American New York Lieutenant Governor
 Edward Warburton Jones (1912–1993), Northern Irish politician
 Edward Wadsworth Jones (1840–1934), American Civil War officer, miner and member of the Los Angeles Common Council

Religion
 Edward Jones (martyr) (died 1590), Catholic martyr
 Edward Jones (bishop) (1641–1703), Bishop of St Asaph
 Edward Jones (Methodist preacher) (c. 1741–after 1806), nicknamed "Ginshop" Jones, Welsh Calvinistic Methodist preacher in London
 (Edward) Michael Gresford Jones (1901–1982), Bishop of Willesden and later of St Albans
 Edward Jones (missionary) (1807–1865), African American missionary to the colony of Sierra Leone
 Edward Jones (Canon of Windsor) (1653–1737), Canon of Windsor

Sports

Coaches and managers
 Edward Jones (football manager), English football manager of the Egypt national team 1949–1952
 Eddie Jones (American football executive) (1938–2012), former General Manager and President of the Miami Dolphins
 Eddie Jones (rugby union) (born 1960), Head coach of the national teams of Australia, Japan and England

Players
 Edward Jones (lacrosse) (1881–1951), British lacrosse player
 Edward Jones (rugby league), rugby league footballer of the 1910s for Wales, and Broughton Rangers
 Edward Jones (cricketer) (1896–1978), Welsh cricketer
 Eddie Jones (footballer, born 1914) (1914–1984), Welsh footballer for Bolton Wanderers and Swindon Town
 Red Borom (Edward Jones Borom, 1915–2011), American baseball player
 Ed "Too Tall" Jones (born 1951), American former football player
 Ed Jones (defensive back) (born 1952), American former Canadian football player
 Eddie Jones (footballer, born 1952), English former professional footballer
 Eddie Jones (basketball) (born 1971), American former basketball player
 Eddie Jones (linebacker) (born 1988), defensive lineman at the University of Texas
 Ed Jones (racing driver) (born 1995), racing driver from the United Arab Emirates
 Eddy Jones, Welsh footballer

Sports venues
 Edward Jones Dome, former name (2002–2016) of The Dome at America's Center multi-purpose stadium in St. Louis

Other
 "The boy Jones" (Edward Jones, 1824–1893), notorious intruder into Buckingham Palace between 1838 and 1841
 Edward Jones (British Army officer, born 1896) (1896–1988), British army brigadier
 Edward Gordon Jones (1914–2007), officer in the Royal Air Force
 Edward Jones (British Army officer) (1936–2007), British army general
 Edward A. Jones (1903–1981), American linguist, scholar and diplomat
 Edward E. Jones (1926–1993), psychologist
 Edward G. Jones (1939–2011), American neuroscientist
 Edward Taylor Jones (1872–1961), British physicist
 Edward N. Jones, president of Texas Tech University, 1952–1959, per List of Texas Tech University presidents

See also
 Edward Burne-Jones (1833–1898), British artist and designer 
 Ted Jones (disambiguation)
 Edgar Jones (disambiguation)
 Edmund Jones (disambiguation)
 Edwin Jones (disambiguation)
 Jones (surname)